"Wild Is the Wind" is a song written by Dimitri Tiomkin and Ned Washington for the 1957 film Wild Is the Wind. Johnny Mathis recorded the song for the film and released it as a single in November 1957. Mathis' version reached No. 22 on the Billboard chart. It was nominated for an Academy Award for Best Song in 1958, but lost to "All the Way" by Jimmy Van Heusen and Sammy Cahn from The Joker is Wild.

The song has been recorded many times, by many performers. The best known versions are by Nina Simone in 1966, and by David Bowie released in 1976/1981 as a tribute to Simone.

Johnny Mathis version
Mathis recorded the song with a flexible sense of meter, rushing some words as if they were speech. At the 30th Academy Awards in 1958 (where it was nominated for Best Song), Mathis performed the song live.

Nina Simone version 
Nina Simone first recorded "Wild Is the Wind" live in 1959; this version appearing on the album Nina Simone at Town Hall. Her most famous interpretation of the song was a studio recording released on the compilation album Wild Is the Wind (1966), made of songs recorded for two earlier album projects. Simone reworked the song with slow, sparse instrumentation, stretching the vocal delivery to express soulful, hopeless loss. Simone's 1966 version appeared on the trailer for the 2008 movie Revolutionary Road. In November 2013 (54 years later after the first release of Simone's version), the song reached number 6 on Billboards Digital Jazz chart.

David Bowie version

David Bowie recorded a version of "Wild Is the Wind" for his 1976 album Station to Station. Bowie was an admirer of Simone’s style, and after meeting her in Los Angeles in 1975, he was inspired to record the song for his album. Bowie later said that Simone's version "really affected me... I recorded it as an hommage to Nina."

Bowie took special care with the contemporary rock arrangement and production of "Wild Is the Wind", committing to an emotional and romantic vocal performance, the words drawn out more slowly and with a greater sense of loss, following the 1966 Simone version rather than the Mathis original.

Single release and promotional video
To promote the 1981 compilation album Changestwobowie, Bowie's version of Wild Is the Wind was released as a single and a black and white promotional video was made, directed by David Mallet. It featured Bowie and four musicians miming to the studio recording, including Tony Visconti (double bass), Coco Schwab (guitar), Mel Gaynor (drums), and Andy Hamilton (saxophone). The black backdrop and stark lighting reproduced the style of Bowie's Isolar – 1976 Tour. The single reached no.24 in the UK.

Personnel
Musicians
 David Bowie – vocals, acoustic guitar, production
 Carlos Alomar or Earl Slick – electric guitar
 George Murray – bass guitar
 Dennis Davis – drums
Producers
 Harry Maslin
 David Bowie

Bowie live
Bowie performed the song during his June 2000 Mini Tour.  A live recording from the BBC Radio Theatre, London, on June 27, 2000, was released on a bonus disc accompanying the first release of Bowie at the Beeb in 2000.  A performance on June 23, 2000 was recorded for Channel 4's TFI Friday. Bowie's performance of the song, as his opening number, at the Glastonbury Festival on June 25, 2000, was released in 2018 on Glastonbury 2000.

Bowie also performed the song with Mike Garson on piano for the Black Ball charity concert in New York in November 2006; the concert was Bowie's final stage performance before his death in 2016.

References

Bibliography
 

1957 songs
1957 singles
1981 singles
Johnny Mathis songs
David Bowie songs
Nina Simone songs
Songs written for films
Songs with lyrics by Ned Washington
Songs with music by Dimitri Tiomkin
Song recordings produced by David Bowie
Columbia Records singles
RCA Records singles
Music videos directed by David Mallet (director)